Pucabatis is a prehistoric genus of ray whose fossils are found in rocks dating from the Maastrichtian stage. The type and only species is P. hoffstetteri. Fossils of Pucabatis have been found in the El Molino Formation of Bolivia and the Bagua Formation of Peru.

See also 

 Flora and fauna of the Maastrichtian stage
 List of prehistoric cartilaginous fish (Chondrichthyes)

References 

Rajiformes
Prehistoric cartilaginous fish genera
Cretaceous cartilaginous fish
Maastrichtian life
Prehistoric fish of South America
Cretaceous Bolivia
Fossils of Bolivia
Cretaceous Peru
Fossils of Peru
Fossil taxa described in 1975